Dunsbear Halt was a relatively well-used  halt on the initially privately run North Devon and Cornwall Junction Light Railway. Opened in 1925 and closed to passenger traffic 40 years later in 1965. The line remained open for freight between Barnstaple railway station and Meeth until 1982. Today it forms part of the popular Tarka trail, and has recently been renovated by conservation volunteers.

References

See also 

List of closed railway stations in Britain
List of former West Country Halts

Disused railway stations in Devon
Former Southern Railway (UK) stations
Railway stations in Great Britain opened in 1925
Railway stations in Great Britain closed in 1965
Beeching closures in England
Torridge District